Lorius is a genus of lory in the parrot family Psittaculidae. The genus contains six species that are distributed from the Moluccas in Indonesia through New Guinea to the Solomon Islands. They have characteristic red plumage with varying amounts of blue (and in some yellow and white), green wings, and in all but one species a black crown. The bills are orange and the feet are grey.

Taxonomy
The genus Lorius was introduced in 1825 by the Irish zoologist Nicholas Aylward Vigors with the purple-naped lory as the type species. The word "lory" comes from the Malay lūri, a name used for a number of species of colourful parrots. The word was used by the Dutch writer Johan Nieuhof in 1682 in a book describing his travels in the East Indies. The spelling "laurey" was used by English naturalist Eleazar Albin in 1731 for a species of parrot from Brazil, and then in 1751 the English naturalist George Edwards used the spelling "lory" when introducing names for five species of parrot from the East Indies in the fourth volume of his A Natural History of Uncommon Birds. Edwards credited Nieuhof for the name.

Species
The genus contains six species.

References

Further reading
 

 
Bird genera
Articles containing video clips
Taxonomy articles created by Polbot